Yoldia cooperii, common name Cooper's yoldia, is a saltwater clam, a marine bivalve mollusk in the family Yoldiidae.

References

Yoldiidae
Molluscs described in 1865